3-Methylbenzylpiperazine (3-Me-BZP) is a stimulant drug which is a derivative of benzylpiperazine. It has been sold as a designer drug, first being identified in Sweden in February 2012.

See also 
 Methylbenzylpiperazine
 Substituted piperazine

References 

Piperazines
Stimulants
Designer drugs
Norepinephrine-dopamine releasing agents